Janna Fennechien "Janneke" Snijder-Hazelhoff (born 26 December 1952) is a Dutch farmer and politician. As a member of the People's Party for Freedom and Democracy (Volkspartij voor Vrijheid en Democratie) she was an MP from  1999 to 2002 and from 3 June 2003 to 19 September 2012. She focused on matters of agriculture, food safety, biotechnology, infrastructure and natural environment. From 14 November 2013 to 1 January 2018 she was acting mayor of Bellingwedde, and acting mayor of Oldebroek from 9 July 2018 to 3 October 2019.

Snijder-Hazelhoff was a member of the municipal council of Termunten from 1982 to 1990 (on behalf of Termunten Gemeente Belangen from 1986 to 1990), a member of the municipal council of Delfzijl from 1990 to 2000 as well as an alderwoman of this municipality from 1998 to 2000. She was also a member of the States-Provincial of Groningen from 1992 to 1999.

References 
  Parlement.com biography

External links 
  People's Party for Freedom and Democracy website

1952 births
Living people
20th-century Dutch politicians
20th-century Dutch women politicians
21st-century Dutch politicians
21st-century Dutch women politicians
Aldermen in Groningen (province)
People from Delfzijl
Dutch farmers
Mayors in Gelderland
People from Oldebroek
Knights of the Order of Orange-Nassau
Members of the House of Representatives (Netherlands)
Members of the Provincial Council of Groningen
Municipal councillors in Groningen (province)
People from Pekela
People's Party for Freedom and Democracy politicians
Protestant Church Christians from the Netherlands
Women mayors of places in the Netherlands